The Recruit is an American spy-adventure television series created by Alexi Hawley for Netflix. The show follows Owen Hendricks (Noah Centineo), a CIA lawyer who becomes involved in massive international conflicts with dangerous parties after an asset tries to expose her relationship to the agency. The series was released on Netflix on December 16, 2022. In January 2023, the series was renewed for a second season.

Synopsis
Fledgling lawyer Owen Hendricks, who has just started working for the CIA, has his life turned upside down when he encounters an asset who demands exoneration from the agency. Once she tries to expose her long-term relationship with the CIA, he becomes entangled in convoluted international politics. As Hendricks negotiates with the asset, he finds himself at odds with menacing individuals and groups, risking his life as he tries to fulfill his duties.

Cast and characters

Main

 Noah Centineo as Owen Hendricks, a newly hired CIA lawyer
 Laura Haddock as Max Meladze, a former CIA asset who is in prison for beating a shady trucker to death
 Aarti Mann as Violet, Owen's co-worker who messes with him
 Colton Dunn as Lester, another co-worker of Owen's, and Violet's partner in crime
 Fivel Stewart as Hannah, Owen's roommate and ex-girlfriend
 Daniel Quincy Annoh as Terence, Owen's other roommate and friend
 Kristian Bruun as Janus Ferber, Owen's overstressed colleague who reluctantly helps him out
 Vondie Curtis-Hall as Walter Nyland, Owen's boss and the CIA's general counsel

Recurring

 Angel Parker as Dawn, CIA operative doing a black op in Yemen
 Victor Andrés Trelles Turgeon as Talco
 Byron Mann as Xander, a senior case officer
 Kaylah Zander as Amelia, another colleague of Owen's who is interested in him romantically

Episodes
Each episode of The Recruit bears CIA-like initials in its title. The codes, which are not unlike the multitude of initials for different divisions and projects that Owen Hendricks must understand in his role within the agency (codes Owen acknowledges at one point he has trouble keeping up with), represent a line of dialogue from their respective episodes.

Production

Development
It was announced that Netflix acquired an unnamed espionage drama on April 28, 2021, with Entertainment One backing the production. Dubbed Graymail, the project was created by Alexi Hawley, executive producer of several popular procedural drama series, such as Castle, The Rookie, and its spin-off. Hawley again served as executive producer as well as showrunner. Alongside Hawley, Noah Centineo; Doug Liman, Gene Klein, and Dave Bartis of Hypnotic; and Adam Ciralsky and Charlie Ebersol of P3 Media also joined the project as executive producers. The project was set as an eight-part one-hour television series. It was unveiled on September 28, 2022, that Hawley, George Ghanem, Amelia Roper, Hadi Deeb, Niceole Levy, and Maya Goldsmith served as the series writers. Meanwhile, Doug Liman, Alex Kalymnios, Emmanuel Osei-Kuffour Jr., and Julian Holmes directed the episodes. On January 26, 2023, Netflix renewed the series for a second season.

Casting
When the production was announced on April 28, 2021, Centineo was unveiled as the lead character of the series. More castings were revealed on November 12, 2021, with Aarti Mann, Daniel Quincy Annoh, Vondie Curtis Hall, Kristian Bruun, Laura Haddock, Colton Dunn, and Fivel Stewart joining the main cast. In addition, Byron Mann, Angel Parker, and Kaylah Zander were also announced in recurring capacities.

Filming
Principal photography for the series reportedly took place in Sorel-Tracy, Quebec and Los Angeles, California, on October 25, 2021. Filming had reportedly wrapped on March 28, 2022.

Release
The Recruit premiered globally on Netflix on December 16, 2022.

Marketing
The series was promoted during Netflix's TUDUM Global event on September 24, 2022, on YouTube. Additional info, including its release date and official title, were unveiled at the official website of the event. The first official trailer for the series was released on YouTube on November 16, 2022.

Reception
The review aggregator website Rotten Tomatoes reported a 67% approval rating, with an average rating of 7.1/10, based on 27 critic reviews. The website's critics consensus reads, "The Recruit may not be the freshest chip off the old block, but it employs Noah Centineo's considerable charms to highly watchable effect." Metacritic, which uses a weighted average, assigned the show a score of 59 out of 100 based on 13 critics, indicating "mixed or average reviews".

Richard Roeper of Chicago Sun-Times gave the series 3 out of 4 stars and said, "Noah Centineo makes a likable lead on the flashy, funny series."

References

External links
 
 

2020s American drama television series
2022 American television series debuts
American adventure television series
American spy drama television series
English-language Netflix original programming
Espionage television series
Television series about the Central Intelligence Agency
Television series by Entertainment One
Television shows filmed in Los Angeles
Television shows filmed in Montreal